The List of railway routes in Saxony provides a list of all railway routes in Saxony, eastern Germany. This includes Intercity-Express, Intercity, Regional-Express and Regionalbahn services. In the route tables, the major stations are shown in bold text. Where intermediate stations are not given, these are replaced by three dots "...".

Intercity services
The following Deutsche Bahn operated Intercity-Express (ICE), EuroCity (EC) and Intercity (IC) services run through Saxony.

Regional services 
The following Regional-Express and Regionalbahn services run through Saxony. They are grouped by operator.

DB Regio

Regional routes

Dresden S-Bahn 

The Dresden S-Bahn is the local railway network of the Dresden agglomeration. It has 3 lines, all passing through Dresden Hauptbahnhof. The S-Bahn network reaches as far as Meissen in the northwest, Dresden Airport in the east, Freiberg in the southwest and Schöna in the southeast.

S-Bahn Mitteldeutschland 

The S-Bahn Mitteldeutschland is the local railway network of the Leipzig-Halle agglomeration. Of its seven lines, six pass through Saxony.

City-Bahn Chemnitz

Die Länderbahn

Döllnitzbahn

Erfurter Bahn

Freiberger Eisenbahn

Mitteldeutsche Regiobahn

Ostdeutsche Eisenbahn

Sächsische Dampfeisenbahngesellschaft

See also 
 List of scheduled railway routes in Germany

References

External links 
 kursbuch.bahn.de Timetables for all railway routes in Germany

Regional rail in Germany
Transport in Saxony
Saxony